The diplomatic relations between Albania and Bulgaria were established in April 1913 and on 10 October 1922, Konstadin Boshniak presented his Letters of Credence as Head of Albanian Legation in Sofia. In March 1954, Albania and Bulgaria raised their diplomatic representation to the level of Embassies. From the early 60s onward the Embassies of our two countries were headed by Charges d`affaires and on 25th of January 1988, an agreement was concluded for an exchange of Ambassadors.

As a European Union (EU) member, Bulgaria supports Albania's bid for membership of the EU.

History 

The territory of modern Albania was part of the Bulgarian Empire during certain periods in the Middle Ages. Most of Albania became part of the First Bulgarian Empire in the early 840s during the rule of Khan Presian. Some coastal areas, such as the town of Durrës, remained under Byzantine control during this time. The Byzantines gradually conquered the remainder of Albania with the decline of the First Bulgarian Empire, taking the last mountain fortresses in 1018–1019. During Byzantine rule, Albania became the center of a major, albeit unsuccessful, Bulgarian uprising.

The last Bulgarian Emperor to govern the whole territory was Ivan Asen II (1218–1241) of the Second Bulgarian Empire. The decline of Bulgaria continued and the country lost its last fortresses in Albania under Constantine Tikh Asen (1257–1277).

During the Albanian National Awakening, many Bulgarian volunteers joined with Albanians Ceta lead by Çerçiz Topulli and Mihal Grameno. Also, Bulgaria aided Albania by printing Albanian books and newspapers at a time when the Albanian language was banned by the Ottoman Empire and neighboring conquerors.

During the Second Balkan War, Albanians helped Bulgaria and sent troops led by Isa Boletiniz. Some of these battles were the uprising of Ohrid and Debar, the Krezna Razlog uprising and other revolts.

Albanians in Bulgaria   

Albanians (albantsi) are presently a minority ethnic group in Bulgaria. Although once a larger population, there were only 278 Albanians recorded in the 2001 Bulgarian Census.) Between the 15th and 17th century, some groups of Albanians (both Roman Catholic and Eastern Orthodox) settled in many parts of modern northern Bulgaria, along with a smaller group settled in southern Thrace.

See also
 Foreign relations of Albania
 Foreign relations of Bulgaria
 Bulgarians in Albania 
 Albanians in Bulgaria
 Accession of Albania to the European Union

References

External links

 

 
Bulgaria
Bilateral relations of Bulgaria